David Wedderburn may refer to:

 David Wedderburn (writer) (1580-1646), Master of Aberdeen Grammar School
 Sir David Wedderburn, 1st Baronet (1775–1858), Scottish Member of Parliament for Perth Burghs
 Sir David Wedderburn, 3rd Baronet (1835–1882), Scottish Member of Parliament for South Ayrshire 1868–1874 and for Haddington Burghs 1879–1882

See also
Ogilvy-Wedderburn Baronets